The 44th FIE Fencing World Cup began in October 2014 and concluded in July 2015 at the 2015 World Fencing Championships held in Moscow.

Season overview
This edition was the first to feature the new Grand Prix format, consisting in nine events, three in each weapon, men and women fencing together. World Cup and Grand Prix competitions were spread over ten months instead of six. The calendar overhaul was designed to allow more time for the athletes to train and rest as well as to increase media visibility.
The season saw the opening of the qualifying path for the 2016 Summer Olympics in Rio de Janeiro.  The first competition counting for Olympic qualification was held on the 2 and 3 May for all three weapons, an event dubbed as the "super weekend" in Italy. The season was also marked by the FIE's cancellation of the men's sabre Dakar World Cup, due to take place on the 1 and 2 November 2014, as a preventive measure because of the Ebola virus epidemic in West Africa. In February 2015, the French delegation withdrew at the last minute from the women's foil World Cup in Algiers because of protests over the depiction of Muhammad after the Charlie Hebdo shooting.

In men's épée, France's Gauthier Grumier won his third World Cup series with a lead of 59 points over Switzerland's Max Heinzer. After a disappointing season, Italy's Rossella Fiamingo earned a European silver medal, then a consecutive second world title. She became the first Italian female epeeist to finish world no.1 since Elisa Uga in 1990, with a 2-point-lead over China's Xu Anqi and a 4-point-lead over Hungary's Emese Szász. France led the rankings in men's team épée with two gold medals and a continental title, followed by South Korea. In the women's, China finished no.1 thanks to two gold medals and a world title, ahead of Romania with four podium placings and a continental gold medal.

In women's foil, Elisa Di Francisca interrupted fellow Italian Arianna Errigo's streak of three series victories by finishing world no.1 for the second time in her career, with three gold medals in a row in Havana, Tauberbischofsheim and Shanghai, and a second consecutive European title in Montreux. She was closely followed by Errigo, who led the rankings for most of the season with three gold medals too, and by Russia's Inna Deriglazova, who claimed five medals and the World title. American Lee Kiefer was the only non-European to win a World Cup event and finished no.4. In men's foil, Race Imboden became the first American male fencer to win the overall World Cup. As in the previous season, three Americans featured in the Top 10. In women's team foil, Italy lost their crown to Russia, who won four gold medals out of five World Cup events. In the men's, Russia also finished first in the rankings, ahead of Italy, with five podiums (including) two gold medals in five competitions.

In men's sabre, Gu Bon-gil won the World Cup series for the second time in a row, followed by fellow South Korean Kim Jung-hwan and Hungary's Áron Szilágyi. In the women's, Russia's Sofiya Velikaya claimed her first end-of-the-season no.1 ranking after winning four World Cup gold medals and the European and World titles. Previous incumbent, Ukraine's Olha Kharlan, took gold medals in all three Grand Prix of the season and finished no.2 with a substantial lead over no.3 Mariel Zagunis of the United States. In men's team sabre, Italy placed first with three podiums, a continental medal and a world title. Russia and Germany finished respectively no.2 and no.3, separated by 2 points from each other. In the women's, Russia took the lead with three podiums and the continental and world titles, ahead of the United States and of Ukraine.

Individual épée

Top 10

Men's épée

Women's épée

Individual foil

Top 10

Men's foil

Women's foil

Individual sabre

Top 10

Men's sabre

Women's sabre

Team épée

Top 10

Men's team épée

Women's team épée

Team foil

Top 10

Men's team foil

Women's team foil

Team sabre

Top 10

Men's team sabre

Women's team sabre

References 

Fencing World Cup
2014 in fencing
2015 in fencing
International fencing competitions hosted by Russia
2015 in Russian sport